Richard Barrett (born 7 March 1945), is a British author who writes about leadership, leadership development, values, consciousness as well as cultural evolution in business and society. He is responsible for developing the theory of the Universal Stages of Evolution, the concepts of personal and cultural entropy, and creating assessment instruments (based on Maslow's hierarchy of human needs and models of higher consciousness) to map the values of individuals, organisations, communities and, nations to the Seven Levels of Consciousness Model. He founded the Barrett Values Centre in 1997.

Early life and education
Richard Barrett was born on 7 March 1945, in Kingston upon Hull, United Kingdom. In 1966, he graduated from Manchester University with a First Class Honors degree in Civil Engineering. He received a postgraduate engineering degree in highway and transportation engineering from Newcastle University .

Career
After spending time working for the Municipality of Leicester and Freeman Fox & Partners, he set up his own consultancy practice in 1977. He acted as a consultant to the World Bank from 1979 to 1985, officially joining the World Bank as a staff member in 1986. In 1992, he became the Assistant to the Vice-President for Environmentally Sustainable Development and started the World Bank Spiritual Unfoldment Society. From 1995 to 1997, he conducted an inquiry into values at the World Bank.
Throughout this period (from 1967 to 1997) Barrett spent most of his spare time studying psychology, spirituality, physics, and personal transformation.

He left the World Bank in 1997 to create the management consulting firm of Richard Barrett & Associates (which became the Barrett Values Centre in 2007). The purpose of this organisation was to "provide consultants, change agents, and human resource professionals with tools and techniques for assessing their values and implementing organizational transformation."

In 1998, he published Liberating the Corporate Soul: Building a Visionary Organisation, in which he described the Seven Levels of Consciousness model and the values mapping instruments known as the Cultural Transformation Tools. He also introduced the concept of the Seven Levels of Leadership Consciousness.

From 1986 to 1999, Barrett lived in Alexandria, Virginia. In 1999, he moved to Western North Carolina in the vicinity of Asheville.

From 2005 to 2007, he spearheaded an inquiry into Whole System Change in organisations. The results of this inquiry are presented in Building a Values-driven Organisation: A Whole System Approach to Cultural Transformation, published in 2006. In this book he showed how the Cultural Transformation Tools had been used to transform the cultures of organisations. He also introduced the concepts of cultural entropy, and personal entropy and showed how they could be measured.

Barrett said, "...more and more companies making some form of contribution to society. They have discovered that making money and making a difference are mutually supportive goals. When companies care about their employees, the local community and society, their employees, the local community and society care about them. The dynamic that I was measuring was simply the wisdom of the golden rule: do unto others as you would have them do unto you, or, as I prefer to describe it, the energy you put out into the world is the energy you get back. This is particularly true with regard to employees."

From 2002 to 2009, he developed the concept of Three Universal Stages of Evolution based on a more inclusive definition of the concept of consciousness. This theory is presented in The New Leadership Paradigm, published in 2011. This book is part of the integrated learning system with a Web site and downloadable learning modules for leading self, leading a team, leading an organisation and leading in society. Other concepts introduced in this book include the Seven Levels of Motivation, The Seven Levels of Identity, the Seven Levels of Happiness, and the Six Modes of Decision-Making.

During the period 2001 to 2007, Barrett experimented using the Cultural Transformation Tools to map the values of nations. Between 2007 and 2010, these tools were used to map the personal values, current culture values, and the desired cultural values of a statistically valid sample 12 nations and several communities. In many of these nations, the results of the values assessments have been used to begin nationwide dialogues on values. In Latvia and Iceland, the results of the values assessments have been instrumental in reorienting public policies.

From June 2009 to September 2010, Barrett moved to Hull to care for his mother who died at age 100 in August 2010. Barrett now lives in Bath, Somerset.

Books
Evolutionary Coaching: a Values-Based Approach to Unleashing Human Potential
The New Leadership Paradigm: Leading Self Journal & Workbook
The New Leadership Paradigm: Leading a Team Journal & Workbook
The New Leadership Paradigm: Leading an Organisation Journal & Workbook
The New Leadership Paradigm: Leading in Society Journal & Workbook
The New Leadership Paradigm (9 January 2011)
Building a Values Driven Organization: A Whole System Approach to Cultural Transformation Butterworth-Heinemann; 1 edition (29 March 2006)
Liberating the Corporate Soul: Building a Visionary Organization Butterworth-Heinemann; 1 edition (5 November 1998)
A Guide to Liberating Your Soul Fulfilling Books (December 1995)

References

Further reading 
The Workplace and Spirituality: New Perspectives on Research and Practice By Joan Marques, Satinder Dhiman, Richard King 
Coaching for Performance: GROWing Human Potential and Purpose – the Principles and Practice of Coaching and Leadership (4th Edition) (People Skills for Professionals) John Whitmore  
Peak by Chip Conley  
The Chrysalis Economy: How Citizen CEOs and Corporations Can Fuse Values and Value Creation by John Elkington  
Get Connected: Culture projects at Volvo by Tor Eneroth, Per Hellsten, Sasha Hamilton
The Spirit at Work Phenomenon by Sue Howard, David Welbourn  
Get Your Groove Back: How to Get the Work and Life You Really Want by Jasbinder Singh  
The Spirit-Led Organization By Sandy Smyth  
Transformation Management: Towards the Integral Enterprise By Ronnie Lessem, Alexander Schieffer  
Spirituality, Inc: Religion in the American Workplace By Lake Lambert, III  
Transforming Learning: Introducing SEAL Approaches By Susan Norman  
Quantum leadership: a Textbook of New Leadership By Timothy Porter-O'Grady, Kathy Malloch  
Spirituality and Business: Exploring Possibilities for a New Management Paradigm By Sharda Shirley Nandram, Margot Esther Borden  
The Supply Management Handbook By Joseph L. Cavinato, Anna E. Flynn, Ralph G. Kauffman  
Leadership Roles for Librarians By Herbert E. Cihak, Joan S. Howland, American Association of Law Libraries  
The Right Leader: Selecting Executives Who Fit By Nat Stoddard, Claire Wyckoff  
The Leadership Genius of George W. Bush: 10 Commonsense Lessons from the Commander and Chief By Carolyn B. Thompson, James W. Ware, Jim Ware  
The Workplace Revolution: Restoring Trust in Business and Bringing Meaning in Our Work By Matthew Gilbert  
Psychometrics in coaching: Using Psychological and Psychometric Tools for Development by Jonathan Passmore  
The Leader's Digest: Timeless Principles for Team and Organization Success By Jim Clemmer 
Leading with Life By Matthias zur Bonsen  
Values Webster Unabridged Bibliography 1996 – Modern Times ASIN: B003YORYJ4
Architectural Research Methods By Linda N. Groat, David Wang  
12 Step Wisdom at Work: Transforming Your Life and Your Organization By William C. Hammond  
Sang Pemimpin By Jim Clemmer
Investment Leadership: Building a Winning Culture for Long Term Success By Jim Ware, Beth Michaels, Dale Primer  
High Performing Investment Teams: How to Achieve Best Practices of Top Firms By Jim Ware, Jim Dethmer, Jamie Ziegler  
Creating Authenticity: Meaningful Questions for the Minds & Souls of Leaders of Today, Volume 2 By Greg Giesen  
The Entrepreneur & the Entrepreneurship Cycle By Roberto Flören
New Horizons In Indian Managements By Pragya M. Kumar Krishna Mohan Mathur, Shiv Shubhang Mathur Nandita Narayan Mathur
Chicken Soup for the Soul at Work: 101 Stories of Courage, Compassion and Creativity in the Workplace By Jack Canfield, Mark Victor Hansen, Maida Rogerson, Martin Rutte, Tim Clauss  
The Knowledge Evolution: Expanding Organizational Intelligence By Verna Allee  
Human Resources in the 21st Century By Marc Effron, Marshall Goldsmith, Robert Gandossy  
Balanced Scorecard Step-by-Step: Maximizing Performance and Maintaining Results By Paul R. Niven  
Balanced Scorecard Step-by-Step for Government and Nonprofit Agencies By Paul R. Niven  
Strategic Planning and Management for Library Managers By Joseph R. Matthews  
The Business of Sustainable Cities: Public-Private Partnerships for Creative Technical and Institutional Solutions edited by Ismail Serageldin, Richard Barrett, Joan Martin-Brown
The Stakeholder Strategy: Profiting From Collaborative Business Relationships By Ann Svendsen  
Beyond Cultures: Perceiving a Common Humanity : Ghanaian Philosophical Studies, III By Kwame Gyekye
Marketing 3.0: From Products to Customers to the Human Spirit By Philip Kotler, Hermawan Kartajaya, Iwan Setiawan  
Healing Presence: The Essence of Nursing By JoEllen Goertz Koerner  
https://books.google.com/books?id=BJDY5T5p2gYC&pg=PA54&dq=richard+barrett+values&hl=en&ei=YW4kTbayKoSYhQfIz6HnAQ&sa=X&oi=book_result&ct=result&resnum=8&ved=0CFYQ6AEwBzgo#v=onepage&q=richard%20barrett%20values&f=false Pervasive Collaborative Networks: Ifip Tc 5 Wg 5. 5 Ninth Working Conference ...] By Luis M. Camarinha-Matos, Willy Picard

External links 
 https://www.aahv.global/richard-barrett.html
 https://www.valuescentre.com/

1945 births
British writers
Living people
Alumni of the University of Manchester
Alumni of Newcastle University